Galassi is an Italian surname. Notable people with the surname include:

Antonio Galassi (1845–1904), Italian opera singer
Galasso Galassi, Italian Renaissance painter
Jonathan Galassi (born 1949), American publisher, translator and poet
Lorenzo Galassi (born 1991), Italian footballer
Mara Galassi (born 1956), Italian harpist and musicologist
Mark Galassi (born 1965), American scientist

Italian-language surnames